Ichiro Shimamura (born 11 March 1949) is a Japanese archer. He competed in the men's individual event at the 1984 Summer Olympics.

References

1949 births
Living people
Japanese male archers
Olympic archers of Japan
Archers at the 1984 Summer Olympics
Place of birth missing (living people)
Asian Games medalists in archery
Archers at the 1978 Asian Games
Archers at the 1986 Asian Games
Asian Games gold medalists for Japan
Asian Games silver medalists for Japan
Medalists at the 1978 Asian Games
Medalists at the 1986 Asian Games